The Law of the Playground is the second studio album by British indie pop band The Boy Least Likely To.  Released on Too Young to Die (which is their own label), The Law of the Playground was released in April 2009.

Track listing
 "Saddle Up"	
 "A Balloon On A Broken String"
 "I Box Up All The Butterflies"
 "The Boy With Two Hearts"
 "Stringing Up Conkers"
 "The Boy Least Likely To Is A Machine"
 "Whiskers"
 "Every Goliath Has Its David"
 "When Life Gives Me Lemons I Make Lemonade"
 "The Nature Of The Boy Least Likely To"
 "I Keep Myself To Myself"
 "The Worm Forgives The Plough"
 "A Fairytale Ending"

References

2009 albums
The Boy Least Likely To albums